Yeysk Airport  is an airport located near the city of Yeysk, Russia.

The base is home to the 859th Centre for Combat Application and Crew Training for Naval Aviation of Russian Naval Aviation.

It was the location of the 959th Bomber Air Regiment, part of the 4th Air and Air Defence Forces Army. The regiment has now been reorganised as an aviation base, part of the new 4th Command of Air Forces and Air Defence.

Yeysk has a mixed military/civilian airfield (:ru:Ейск (аэропорт)), home to the Yeysk Military Institute during the Cold War and the 10th Mixed Aviation Division (4th Air Army) during the 1990s.

After the disbandment of the 10th Mixed Aviation Division the headquarters of the 1st Guards Stalingrad, Svirsky Composite Air Division arrived. Also at the airport based aviation group Yeisk Higher Military Institute, equipped with planes L-39.

In addition, the 959th Bomber Regiment was previously based at the airfield, which was part of the 1st Guards Composite Air Division. The 959th Bomber Aviation Regiment was previously the 959th Training Aviation Regiment. In September 2009, due to the transfer of the airfield from the Air Force to the Navy, the regiment was disbanded, and its members were part of the aircraft Su-24 relocated to Morozovsk airfield (6970th Air Base, 7th Brigade of Aerospace Defence).

On 1 February 2010, the 859th Naval Aviation Training Center under the leadership of Major-General Alexei Serdyuk was open at the airfield. To ensure the educational process training units will be relocated from the Ostrov (air base) (Pskov Oblast) and the village of Kacha. For service center from the previously disbanded and civilian staff will be involved in more than one thousand people.

Airlines and destinations

References

External links

Airports built in the Soviet Union
Airports in Krasnodar Krai
Russian Air Force bases
Russian Navy
Russian and Soviet Navy bases